Hay River Reserve (also known as Kʼatlodeeche/Katlʼodeeche First Nation or Hay River Dene 1) is one of only three Indian reserves in Canada's Northwest Territories. Located in the South Slave Region, it is a Slavey community with a population of 259, of which the majority are First Nations and some Métis, at the 2021 Canadian census, a 16.2% decrease from the 2016 census. The main languages on the reserve are South Slavey, and English. In 2017 the Government of the Northwest Territories reported that the population was 329, resulting in an average annual growth rate of 0.4% between 2007 and 2017.

The reserve is governed by a Band Council, consisting of a Chief and four Counsellors, who are elected every two years on "Treaty Day". Along with the Fort Providence Dene Band the reserve operates "Evergreen Forestry Management Ltd." The reserve also runs the Ehdah Cho Store, "Tu-Cho Gha Contracting", and the "Nats’jee Keh Treatment Centre".

Primary and secondary education in the community is provided by Chief Sunrise Education Centre.

History 

Although the Dene had been using the area around the mouth of the Hay River for many years as a fishing site it was not settled until the 1890s when Chief Chiatlo led a group to the site. Later both the Anglican, with a mission school, and the Roman Catholic Church along with trading posts and the Royal Canadian Mounted Police arrived. However, the NWT Government says that the first building in the area was the Hudson's Bay Company, followed by the Roman Catholic Mission, and then the Anglican Mission.

The original site was located right at the mouth of the river just east of Vale Island at  However, this site was subject to flooding and it was decided to move to a different area. The current site is located on the south shore of the Hay River, near the mouth of Great Slave Lake In 1974 the then chief, Daniel Sonfrere, negotiated a settlement with the Government of Canada and the first reserve in the NWT was formed.

The site of the original mission buildings, including St. Peter's Anglican Church, Ste. Anne's Roman Catholic Church, the remains of a rectory, and associated cemeteries, was designated as a National Historic Site of Canada in 1992, due to its association with the meeting of Dene and European cultures.

Gallery

Climate
Hay River has a subarctic climate (Dfc) with mild to warm summers and long cold winters.

Demographics 

Arts and culture 
Hay River Reserve is the setting for a children's story called Smelly Socks. The book was written by Robert Munsch and illustrated by Michael Martchenko. Munsch created the story based on a little girl named Tina whom he met while visiting the reserve in 1984. The illustrations in the book were based on actual pictures of Tina and the community provided by local multimedia artist Frederick Lepine.

See also
Hay River
Hay River/Merlyn Carter Airport
Hay River Water Aerodrome
Hay River (District) Heliport

References

Communities in the South Slave Region
Dene communities
Indian reserves in the Northwest Territories